Enoch R. Weiss (February 13, 1848 – December 29, 1917) was a United States Medal of Honor recipient from Indiana.

Early life
Enoch R. Weiss was born on February 13, 1848, in Kosciusko County, Indiana.

Career
Weiss served as a private in Company G, 1st Cavalry, United States Army. He received a Medal of Honor for "gallantry in action with Indians" in the Chiricahua Mountains in the Arizona Territory on October 20, 1869. He received the Medal of Honor on February 14, 1870.

Personal life
Weiss married Ida R. Foegley on June 17, 1880. They had three daughters and two sons, Mary, Emma, Dorothy, Harry and Bert. His wife died on July 19, 1911.

Weiss died on December 29, 1917, in South Bend, Indiana. He was buried at South Bend City Cemetery.

References

1848 births
1917 deaths
People from Kosciusko County, Indiana
People from South Bend, Indiana
United States Army Medal of Honor recipients